Violetta is an Argentine telenovela filmed in Buenos Aires, Argentina and developed by Disney Channel Latin America and Europe, Middle East and Africa (EMEA) and production company Pol-ka, debuted in Argentina, Latin America and Italy on May 14, 2012.

Violetta tells the story of a musically talented teenager (played by Martina Stoessel) who returns to her native Argentina with her father, Germán (played by Diego Ramos), after living in Europe for several years, navigating the trials and tribulations of growing up.

Each episode includes original musical numbers from diverse musical genres such as pop music and Latin music.

Plot

Season 1 (2012) 

Violetta Castillo is a 17-year old teenage girl who is unaware of her very special talent for singing. She inherited this talent from her mom (María), a famous singer who died in a plane crash.
Germán (Diego Ramos), her dad, is a very successful man who travels a lot and loves his daughter, despite being strict and overprotective. Blinded by sadness, he decides to keep her past and her mother's fate from Violetta, worried that she might follow in her footsteps.
After the accident, they both moved to Madrid and he raised her alone, with hardly any contact with other children of her age. Germán is aware that Violetta is a very talented musician and he encourages her to take piano lessons but keeps her away from singing.
Everything changes when they return to their homeland in Buenos Aires. There, Violetta starts taking piano lessons at 'Studio 21' (later On Beat Studio), a prestigious music school. She meets Angie (María Clara Alonso), her new teacher, governess, and secretly her aunt (sister of Violetta's mother, unbeknownst to Germán) who helps her to realize her talent. Angie fears that if she tells Violetta or Germán the truth, Germán would take Violetta away to another country, where she could never see Violetta again. Violetta falls in love with Tomás (Pablo Espinosa) but Francesca (Lodovica Comello), her new best friend, already liked him. Ludmila (Mercedes Lambre), the richest and most arrogant girl in Studio 21, also falls in love with Tomás, angering León (Jorge Blanco), her old boyfriend. Later, Ludmila and Tomás start dating. León got furious and, to teach Ludmila and Tomás a lesson, he decides to date Violetta. Contrary to his plans, he begins falling in love with Violetta and she starts to fall in love with León, which irritates Tomás and Ludmila, who are just beginning to date. Germán is engaged to Jade (Florencia Benitez), an unintelligent woman who, though very ambitious, is callous and hates Violetta. Jade does everything to marry Germán because she loves him truly, but Matías, her older brother, wants her to marry Germán because of his money because he got broke. Violetta has never agreed with this and always argues with Jade. Later, Jade discovers that Violetta's secretly studying music in Studio 21, and makes Machiavellian dealings with her: if she encourages Jade's marriage to Germán, she won't tell Violetta's secret to Germán. In the end, Germán discovers that Violetta studies in the Studio and that Angie is actually her aunt who always helped and covered for Violetta all along. Germán decides to take Violetta away, but thanks to Angie he understands the passion of Violetta at the last minute and decides to stay in Buenos Aires, allowing Violetta to continue at Studio 21. In the end Tomás goes back to Spain as he has the opportunity to make something of his music and Ludmila makes peace with everybody. León promises himself to forget Violetta.

Season 2 (2013) 

In the second season, Violetta starts falling in love with León and he feels the same for her. They start to date, but Diego (Diego Domínguez), who is new at Studio 21, steals a kiss from Violetta. Ludmila continues to be an unkind and glamorous girl who does everything to get what she wants: she called in  her friend since childhood to help her get rid of Violetta from the studio but she became impatient and blackmailed Diego to continue to pretend that he loves Violetta, telling him that if he will do that, she will tell him who his father is (as his father abandoned him when he was a child). Marco does everything to date Francesca, who doesn't  know what she feels for him. Camila and Broduey start the season fighting, but end up friends, Camila meets DJ and he liked her, but he left. Camila and Maxi kissed but didn't feel anything, Sebas (Rock Bones) comes and they fell in love, until they get together at the end. Naty, Ludmila's best friend, and Maxi, also split up at first, but come back in full force. Francesca falls in love with Marco (Xabiani Ponce de León) after  many doubts and thoughts (Diego's  best friend). Ludmila starts falling in love with Federico (Ruggero Pasquarelli) and get together at the end. Diego finds out that his father is Gregorio, a selfish teacher that works at the Studio. Diego is very mad at Gregorio for abandoning him; at the end, they make peace. Angie goes away to France, leaving Germán alone. Esmeralda is hired by Jade and Matías to win Germán over and steal his money. However, on their wedding day, Jade reveals that Esmeralda is a scam. The two are arrested and Matías starts dating the deputy who arrested him, Marcela Parodi. León suspected Diego all along, and found proof that Diego and Ludmila were together to make Violetta sad and humiliated on her big performance when they were going to say that Diego never loved Violetta. León shows the footage of proof on his cellphone to Francesca, but Violetta overhears. Violetta starts crying during her performance without any strength to sing. However, León gets on stage and starts singing "Podemos" with Violetta. Camila and Broduey get back together, as do Francesca and Marco, after a big interference with Marco's ex-girlfriend. Violetta and León get back together, and in the end, after all that has passed, their love is stronger than ever.

Season 3 (2014)
The studio cast of On Beat went on a major world tour, which had been successful in Europe. Violetta and her friends had to return to Buenos Aires for their last year of school. With dreams and individual ambitions multiplied by fame, the group began to crumble, putting Studio On Beat in danger. Gery, who falls in love with León, and Clément (also known as Alex), who falls in love with Violetta, are introduced at the beginning of the season. Violetta and Ludmila are forced to share the same roof when Germán and Priscilla, mother of Ludmila, start dating and later get married, but Priscilla turns out to be a snake and the worst person anyone has ever met. Violetta and León become separated, but still love each other, but Alex and Gery will do anything to keep them separate, since they are passionate, respectively, for Violetta and León. Marco goes away, and Francesca and Diego fall in love with each other. However, Francesca is afraid of Violetta finding out (since Diego regrets what he did to Violetta during the previous season) and decides to keep their relationship secret. With the death of Antonio (the previous director of Studio 21), Pablo exits Studio On Beat at the end of You Mix sponsorship, the site slowly goes bankrupt and it is up to Gregorio, the new director, Angie (who returns in this season) and Beto, with the help of Germán, to save the studio. Ludmila starts to become a better person and when forced to choose between staying in the Studio On Beat or be a star, she chooses the Studio. In order to spy on León, Violetta and Francesca masquerade as Roxy and Fausta, but León falls in love with Roxy, and Violetta is forced to tell him the truth. The group travel to Seville, Spain where Violetta and Leon realize their true feelings for each other and Gery and Clement end up together. In Seville, they put on their last tremendous show. After performing their last songs ever, Germán proposes to Angie. The series ends with Germán marrying Angie, back in Buenos Aires, with everyone singing "Crecimos Juntos".

Cast and characters

Main 

Legend
 = Main cast (credited)
 = Recurring cast (2+)
 = Guest cast (1)

Recurring

Production 

Following the global phenomenon of Patito Feo, an Argentine telenovela produced by Ideas del Sur that aired on Disney Channel between July 2007 and March 2011 in Latin America, Europe and Asia, receiving consistently high viewership and becoming an international success of merchandise, soundtrack albums, and concert tours; Disney decided to begin production on its own first original telenovela. The show, inspired by Patito Feo, was produced in Argentina in collaboration with local production company Pol-Ka. The cast was formed by actors from across Hispanic America, Brazil, Spain and Italy.

Filming began in September 2011 in Buenos Aires, Argentina, and lasted for seven months. The series was co-produced by Disney Channel Latin America, Europe, Middle East and Africa. The series was filmed entirely in high definition at the Central Park Studios in Buenos Aires. On December 31, 2011, Disney Channel Latin America broadcast a New Year's television special entitled Celebratón, where Martina Stoessel performed the song Tu Resplandor (Disney Princesses). Disney Channel announced that the series would premiere in 2012. The cast was first introduced on December 22, 2011. In March 2012, promos and ads started airing to promote the series.

In early April 2012, a music video for "En Mi Mundo", sung by Martina Stoessel, was uploaded to Disney Channel Latin America's website. Violetta finally premiered in Latin America and Italy on May 14, 2012. The cast visited Mexico City and Bogotá and sung live on a Radio Disney event at Luna Park in Buenos Aires. On October 25, the last episode of the first season was aired. Between September and October 2012, the show had its premiere in Brazil, France, Israel and Spain.

On November 1, 2012, shootings for the second season began. The second season started in Latin America in April, in Italy in June and in Spain in September. The complete cast visited Paris, Milan and Madrid for promotion at the end of June. The final scenes from the second season were shot in Spain.

Among the products spawned from the shows was an official magazine (available in Latin America, Italy and Spain), sticker album (available in France, Latin America, Italy and Spain), a series of books (available in Latin America, France, Spain and Italy) and trading cards (available in Italy and Argentina). DVDs were also released in Italy and Spain. There's also a soundtrack album featuring the music from the show. The album has achieved 3× Platinum in Argentina, Platinum in Spain and Gold Certification in Chile and Brazil.

In June 2013, after three months of rehearsal, the musical with the complete cast made its debut at Teatro Gran Rex. Following the Patito Feo model, the cast played concerts daily during the Winter Vacation. Prior to the debut, all 60 presentations were already sold out with over 200.000 tickets sold. After the season in Buenos Aires, the cast also toured across Argentina, Latin America and Europe. Besides the 60 concerts in Buenos Aires, the cast also toured the rest of Argentina.

In October 2013, Diego Ramos announced a third season. Production began in March 2014 for a July 28, 2014 premiere. This was the final season.

Casting 
Martina Stoessel was chosen by casting. The actor Diego Ramos was instead cast as the Violetta's father by proposal and following an audition, sent to Europe, has been confirmed. While actress Lodovica Comello, who played Francesca, was attending school in Milan, her school's principal informed the students that there would be an audition; she decided to participate. Instead, the actor Ruggero Pasquarelli was chosen by proposal. For the second season, casting calls were also held at the request of fans of the series in Milan, Naples and Rome.

It was confirmed that most of the cast of the first season, except for actors Rodrigo Velilla, Artur Logunov and lead actor Pablo Espinosa will return for the second season. It was also announced the inclusion of new characters played by Diego Domínguez who will play the new rival of León, Diego, and then actors like Valeria Baroni, Xabiani Ponce De León, Paloma Sirvén, Gerardo Velázquez, Carla Pandolfi and Valentina Frione. Bridgit Mendler made a cameo appearance in the second season.

For the third season, there were new characters played by Damien Lauretta, Macarena Miguel, Rodrigo Frampton, Florencia Ortiz and Nacho Gadano. The American pop rock band R5 made an appearance during an episode in the third season, performing their 2014 single "Heart Made Up on You".

Broadcast 
The first season originally aired from May 14 to October 26, 2012, in Latin America. On Disney Channel (UK & Ireland) the season ran from July 22, 2013, to August 28, 2014. It premiered on August 26, 2013, and ended on April 4, 2014, on Disney Channel (Europe, Middle East and Africa). On Disney Channel (Scandinavia), it premiered October 14, 2013 and ended June 6 the following year. On Disney Channel (Australia and New Zealand), the first season premiered on October 18, 2013.      It is not known if it finished its run on television, but the complete first season was available at the launch of Netflix in those territories. In the United States, it premiered on September 1, 2014, on Azteca and ended on December 19. The show had its English language debut with the first two seasons being made available on Netflix U.S. starting July 10, 2015.

When Disney+ launched in November 2019, the first season of Violetta appeared on the service for the first time in the U.S. since Netflix removed the show sometime in 2017–2018.

The second season originally aired from April 29 to October 11, 2013, in Latin America. It premiered on August 25, 2014, on Disney Channel (Europe, Middle East and Africa) and ended April 10, 2015. Prior to the season finale, Netflix Latin America started putting up the English audio on episodes that had not yet aired in English internationally. On Disney Channel (Scandinavia), it premiered on October 13, 2014, and ended May 29, 2015. Disney Channel (UK & Ireland) then aired the season everyday starting June 1 at 10:10pm until August 19. In Australia, the complete second season was put up weeks after the first on Netflix, but has not aired on Disney Channel.

The second season of Violetta appeared on Disney+ on May 29, 2020.

The third season originally aired from the July 28, 2014 to February 6, 2015, in Latin America. On Disney Channel (Europe, Middle East and Africa), it premiered September 21, 2015. By October 2015, all episodes were available in English on Netflix Latin America. On Disney Channel (Scandinavia), the season premiered on October 12, 2015. The season was added to Netflix U.S. on December 31, 2015. Disney Channel (UK & Ireland) aired season 3 on July 4, 2016, at 10pm and the final episode of season 3 was shown on 1 January 2017.

The third season of Violetta arrived on Disney+ on September 18, 2020.

Reception

Viewership 
In Chile, the average viewers were about 352,000. In Spain, the first episode received a 3.1% share or 461,000 viewers and it had increased by 93% by the end of the first season. The series was also successful in Mexico, Colombia, and Brazil for kids aged 4–11. It was also popular online, with 5 million YouTube visits, 50 million official website visits, and over 80 million Facebook visits. The first episode in Italy received 195,973 viewers, making it Disney Channel's most watched broadcast in the country. The average for each episode was around 200,000 viewers. The Rai Gulp premiere had a 1% share or 272,000 viewers and the second episode received 300,000 viewers or a share of 1.34%. In the UK, the show got 104,000 views in the first day, then it increased to 115,000 a week later  making it the 3rd watched show of that week. The show wasn't very popular with the public. It was criticized for the dubbed singing in the first season of the series, but the show's rating was at 9.5. In 2014 however, it changed, as it had decreased to 6.8 in 2015.

Awards and nominations

Films

Violetta: La emoción del concierto 

A film titled Violetta: La emoción del concierto (also known as Violetta en Vivo and Violetta: en Concierto) was shown in cinemas and released on DVD internationally, showing the concert and backstage scenes from Milan. Another version showing the Buenos Aires concert was released in Argentina. It was originally released on April 3, 2014, in Latin America, on May 9, 2014, in Spain, and on June 28, 2014, in Italy. In Argentina, the film was number six at the box office for the second week of April 2014.

Tini: The Movie 

The film Tini: The Movie premiered in Argentina and France on May 4, 2016, and in Spain on May 6, 2016. It features American actress Sofia Carson as the antagonist.

Related programs

The U-Mix Show 
The U-Mix Show was a weekly program that aired a weekly summary of the series and interviews with cast members. It was hosted by Roger González and Daniel Martins. In Brazil, the show was presented by Bruno Heder.

El V-log de Francesca 
El V-log de Francesca is a webseries starring Lodovica Comello set in her bedroom. The sixteen-episode miniseries premiered on June 10, 2012, and lasted until October 22, 2012. The episodes were also dubbed in Italian as "Il videoblog di Francesca", on Disney Channel Italy, in Brazil as "O V-log de Francesca". and in the Netherlands as "De V-Log van Francisca"

Ludmila Cyberst@r 
Ludmila Cyberst@r is another webseries that premiered on June 1, 2012, on the official YouTube channel of Disney Channel Latin America. The series consisted of eight episodes, that aired until September 17, 2012 and then continuously loaded on the same website from Portuguese channel's Disney Channel.
Disney Channel UK premiered it on May 2, 2014  on the official Disney Channel UK YouTube channel and ran until May 24, 2014, This is the only Violetta-related program which has been dubbed into English so far.

Tours

Violetta en Vivo 
In early 2013, it was confirmed that there would be a stage adaptation starring Martina Stoessel, Jorge Blanco, Diego Domínguez, and other actors. The series premiered on July 13, 2013, at Teatro Gran Rex in Buenos Aires. 77 performances happened through July, August and September twice a day. Over 120,000 tickets have been sold in Buenos Aires alone, which later increased to 160,000. However, there were no plans to show it in the UK.

Violetta Live 
Violetta Live 2015 International Tour was the 2015 tour of the cast of Violetta. The tour was announced in August by the site bambini Italy. The cast toured several countries in Europe and Latin America.

In other media

Music 
Throughout the series, En mi mundo is used as the opening and the ending (except in some cases for the latter). In Brazil, a Portuguese version is sung by Mayra Arduini (from College 11) with the name "Em Meu Mundo". In Italy, Stoessel sings the Italian version titled "Nel mio mondo",  In France, Cynthia sung a French version of the theme song called Dans Mon Monde for the French release of Cantar es lo que soy. The English version, called In My Own World, was released on iTunes Ireland on August 9, 2013. Russia also used a dubbed version of the theme song.

On July 10, 2015, along with the release of the show on Netflix, Walt Disney Records put up a compilation album called Violetta: En mi mundo containing 13 songs from Violetta and Cantar es lo que soy for the United States.

Magazine 
From October 10, 2012, the official magazine of the series entitled Violetta was available in Italy. The monthly magazine was directed by Veronica Di Lisio and offered interviews, unpublished photographs of the series and even games, posters and rubrics for the female audience. In Argentina, it was also published in a magazine with the same content as the Italian one. In Chile, it was able to be purchased from December 21, 2012. Even in Portugal and Spain, there was the monthly magazine dedicated to the telenovela.

Sticker album 
On the same day it was published in the magazine, it was also released on the sticker album, affordable attached to the magazine or individually. The album was published by Panini.

Video game 
A Violetta video game has been released, called Disney Violetta: Rhythm & Music developed by Game Machine Studios and published by Little Orbit in collaboration with Disney Interactive Studios. The game was released on Wii, Nintendo DS and 3DS systems in 2014. Junto A Ti is featured in Just Dance 2016, while En Mi Mundo and Hoy Somos Más are featured on Just Dance: Disney Party 2.

Other products 
Other products have also been published on the market like Easter eggs and notebooks (in Brazil). In addition, the Italian actor Simon Lijoi had created his column titled "Chiedilo a Simone" where fans via his Facebook page asked some questions and he answered; the first article was published on March 22, 2013, and was later published every Thursday.

Notes

References

External links 
 

 
Television series by Disney
Disney Channel (Latin American TV channel) original programming
Disney Channel telenovelas
2010s Argentine television series
2012 Argentine television series debuts
Argentine telenovelas
Teen telenovelas
Spanish-language Disney Channel original programming
Disney Channels Worldwide original programming
2015 Argentine television series endings
Musical telenovelas
Pol-ka telenovelas
2012 telenovelas
Television series about teenagers